The Ron Clark Academy is a non-profit middle school, housed in a renovated red brick warehouse located in southeast Atlanta, Georgia, United States. Founded by its namesake, Ron Clark, and co-founder Kim Bearden, the school has students in fourth through eighth grades, from a wide range of economic backgrounds. Classes began on September 4, 2007.

Media attention 
Students in debate class at Ron Clark Academy created a song about the 2008 U.S. presidential election, "Vote However You Like", to the same beat and melody of "Whatever You Like" by T.I.  A performance of the song by 6th and 7th graders was posted on the internet and drew a wide viewership. 
T.I. paid a surprise visit to the Academy after learning of their remake of his song.
On October 31, 2008, the "Students of Ron Clark Academy" were named the ABC Person of the Week by ABC World News Tonight.
They were also invited to perform at the 2009 Inauguration.

A video of the students of Ron Clark Academy being told they were seeing the Marvel film Black Panther went viral and was covered by many major news outlets.

In January 2019, the school produced a music video in collaboration with the rapper Ludacris and Mercedes-Benz, one of the school's donors. It was a promotional video for Super Bowl LIII, which was held in Atlanta that year. The music video highlighted notable locations and businesses located in Atlanta.

References

External links
 

Middle schools in Georgia (U.S. state)
Private schools in Georgia (U.S. state)
Schools in Atlanta
Educational institutions established in 2007
2007 establishments in Georgia (U.S. state)